On March 23, 2009, the United States Federal Deposit Insurance Corporation (FDIC), the Federal Reserve, and the United States Treasury Department announced the Public–Private Investment Program for Legacy Assets.  The program is designed to provide liquidity for so-called "toxic assets" on the balance sheets of financial institutions.  This program is one of the initiatives coming out of the implementation of the Troubled Asset Relief Program (TARP) as implemented by the U.S. Treasury under Secretary Timothy Geithner.  The major stock market indexes in the United States rallied on the day of the announcement rising by over six percent with the shares of bank stocks leading the way. As of early June 2009, the program had not been implemented yet and was considered delayed.  Yet, the Legacy Securities Program implemented by the Federal Reserve has begun by fall 2009 and the Legacy Loans Program is being tested by the FDIC.  The proposed size of the program has been drastically reduced relative to its proposed size when it was rolled out.

Background
One major proximate cause of the financial crisis of 2007–2008 was the problem of "legacy assets." This term referred to:
 real estate loans held directly on the books of banks ("legacy loans"), and
 securities (ABSs and MBSs) backed by loan portfolios ("legacy securities").
These assets create uncertainty around the balance sheets of these financial institutions, compromising their ability to raise capital and their willingness to increase lending.

Earlier in the decade, in response to the economic downturn caused by the September 11, 2001 attacks, the Federal Reserve lowered its target interest rates which, along with securitized credit instruments (legacy assets), caused increased credit availability for real estate loans. This increase in the availability of credit pushed up housing prices, causing a bubble.

The problem came with the bursting of the housing bubble in 2007, which generated losses for investors and banks. Losses were compounded by the lax underwriting standards that had been used by some lenders and by the proliferation of the complex securitization instruments, some of whose risks were not fully understood. The resulting need by investors and banks to reduce risk triggered a wide-scale deleveraging in these markets and led to fire sales. As prices declined, many traditional investors exited these markets, causing declines in market liquidity. As a result, a negative cycle developed where declining asset prices have triggered further deleveraging, which has in turn led to further price declines. The excessive discounts embedded in some legacy asset prices are now straining the capital of U.S. financial institutions, limiting their ability to lend and increasing the cost of credit throughout the financial system. The lack of clarity about the value of these legacy assets also made it difficult for some financial institutions to raise new private capital on their own.

It is widely held that because of the stringent mandates from the U.S. government, financial institutions were forced to lend cheap money to unqualified borrowers increasing the risk on their books.

General
Using $75 to $100 billion in TARP capital and capital from private investors, the Public–Private Investment Program (P-PIP) will generate $500 billion in purchasing power to buy legacy assets with the potential to expand to $1 trillion over time. The Public–Private Investment Program will be designed around three basic principles:

Maximizing the impact of each taxpayer dollar: first, by using government financing in partnership with the FDIC and Federal Reserve and co-investment with private sector investors, substantial purchasing power will be created, making the most of taxpayer resources.
Shared risk and profits with private sector participants: second, the Public–Private Investment Program ensures that private sector participants invest alongside the taxpayer, with the private sector investors standing to lose their entire investment in a downside scenario and the taxpayer sharing in profitable returns.
Private sector price discovery: third, to reduce the likelihood that the government will overpay for these assets, private sector investors competing with one another will establish the price of the loans and securities purchased under the program.

PPIP uses a combination of private equity and Government equity and debt through TARP to facilitate purchases of legacy mortgage-backed securities ("MBS") held by financial institutions. In July 2009, Treasury announced the selection of nine Public–Private Investment Fund ("PPIF") managers. Treasury has obligated $21.9 billion in TARP funds to the program. In January 2010, PPIP manager The TCW Group Inc. ("TCW") withdrew from the program. On April 3, 2012, PPIP manager Invesco announced it had sold all remaining securities in its portfolio and was in the process of winding up the fund. The remaining seven PPIP managers are currently purchasing investments and managing their portfolios.

According to Treasury, the purpose of the Public–Private Investment Program ("PPIP") is to purchase legacy securities from banks, insurance companies, mutual funds, pension funds, and other eligible financial institutions as defined in EESA, through PPIFs. PPIFs are partnerships, formed specifically for this program, that invest in mortgage-backed securities using equity capital from private-sector investors combined with TARP equity and debt. A private-sector fund management firm oversees each PPIF on behalf of these investors. According to Treasury, the aim of PPIP was to "restart the market for legacy securities, allowing banks and other financial institutions to free up capital and stimulate the extension of new credit." PPIP originally included a Legacy Loans subprogram that would have involved purchases of troubled legacy loans with private and Treasury equity capital, as well as an FDIC guarantee for debt financing. TARP funds were never disbursed for this subprogram.

Treasury selected nine fund management firms to establish PPIFs. One PPIP manager, The TCW Group, Inc., ("TCW") subsequently withdrew, and another PPIP manager, Invesco, announced recently that it has sold all remaining securities in its PPIP fund. Private investors and Treasury co-invested in the PPIFs to purchase legacy securities from financial institutions. The fund managers raised private-sector capital. Treasury matched the private-sector equity dollar-for-dollar and provided debt financing in the amount of the total combined equity. Each PPIP manager was also required to invest at least $20 million of its own money in the PPIF. Each PPIF is approximately 75% TARP funded. PPIP was designed as an eight-year program. PPIP managers have until 2017 to sell the assets in their portfolio. Under certain circumstances, Treasury can terminate it early or extend it for up to two additional years.

Treasury, the PPIP managers, and the private investors share PPIF profits and losses on a pro rata basis based on their limited partnership interests. Treasury also received warrants in each PPIF that give Treasury the right to receive a portion of the fund's profits that would otherwise be distributed to the private investors along with its pro rata share of program proceeds.

The PPIP portfolio, consisting of eligible securities, was valued at $21.1 billion as of March 31, 2012, according to a process administered by Bank of New York Mellon, acting as valuation agent. That was $600 million higher than the portfolio value at the end of the previous quarter. The portfolio value was also affected by Invesco's sale of its remaining securities in March 2012, discussed in greater detail in this section. In addition to the eligible securities, the PPIP portfolio also consists of cash assets to be used to purchase securities. The securities eligible for purchase by PPIFs ("eligible assets") are non-agency residential mortgage-backed securities ("non-agency RMBS") and commercial mortgage-backed securities ("CMBS") that meet the following criteria: 
 issued before January 1, 2009 (legacy)
 rated when issued AAA or equivalent by two or more credit rating agencies designated as nationally recognized statistical rating organizations ("NRSROs") 
 secured directly by actual mortgages, leases, or other assets, not other securities (other than certain swap positions, as determined by Treasury) 
 located primarily in the United States (the loans and other assets that secure the non-agency RMBS and CMBS)
 purchased from financial institutions that are eligible for TARP participation

Two assets types
The Public–Private Investment Program has two parts, addressing both the legacy loans and legacy securities clogging the balance sheets of financial firms.  The funds will come in many instances in equal parts from the U.S. Treasury's Troubled Asset Relief Program monies, private investors, and from loans from the Federal Reserve's Term Asset-Backed Securities Loan Facility (TALF).

Legacy loans
The overhang of troubled legacy loans stuck on bank balance sheets has made it difficult for banks to access private markets for new capital and limited their ability to lend. To cleanse bank balance sheets of troubled legacy loans and reduce the overhang of uncertainty associated with these assets, they will attract private capital to purchase eligible legacy loans from participating banks through the provision of FDIC debt guarantees and Treasury equity co-investment. The Treasury Department currently anticipates that approximately half of the TARP resources for legacy assets will be devoted to the Legacy Loans Program, but the program will allow for flexibility to allocate resources for the greatest impact.

A broad array of investors are expected to participate in the Legacy Loans Program. The participation of individual investors, pension plans, insurance companies and other long-term investors is particularly encouraged. The Legacy Loans Program will facilitate the creation of individual Public–Private Investment Funds which will purchase asset pools on a discrete basis. The program will boost private demand for distressed assets that are currently held by banks and facilitate market-priced sales of troubled assets.

The FDIC will provide oversight for the formation, funding, and operation of these new funds that will purchase assets from banks. Treasury and private capital will provide equity financing and the FDIC will provide a guarantee for debt financing issued by the Public–Private Investment Funds to fund asset purchases. The Treasury will manage its investment on behalf of taxpayers to ensure the public interest is protected. The Treasury intends to provide 50 percent of the equity capital for each fund, but private managers will retain control of asset management subject to oversight from the FDIC.

Purchasing assets in the Legacy Loans Program will occur through the following process:
Banks identify the assets they wish to sell: to start the process, banks will decide which assets usually a pool of loans  they would like to sell. The FDIC will conduct an analysis to determine the amount of funding it is willing to guarantee. Leverage will not exceed a 6-to-1 debt-to-equity ratio. Assets eligible for purchase will be determined by the participating banks, their primary regulators, the FDIC and Treasury. Financial institutions of all sizes will be eligible to sell assets.
Pools are auctioned off to the highest bidder: the FDIC will conduct an auction for these pools of loans. The highest bidder will have access to the Public–Private Investment Program to fund 50 percent of the equity requirement of their purchase.
Financing is provided through FDIC guarantee: if the seller accepts the purchase price, the buyer would receive financing by issuing debt guaranteed by the FDIC. The FDIC-guaranteed debt would be collateralized by the purchased assets and the FDIC would receive a fee in return for its guarantee.
Private sector partners manage the assets: once the assets have been sold, private fund managers will control and manage the assets until final liquidation, subject to strict FDIC oversight.

Legacy securities
Secondary markets have become highly illiquid, and are trading at prices below where they would be in normally functioning markets. These securities are held by banks as well as insurance companies, pension funds, mutual funds, and funds held in individual retirement accounts.

The goal of the Legacy Securities Program is to restart the market for legacy securities, allowing banks and other financial institutions to free up capital and stimulate the extension of new credit. The Treasury anticipates that the resulting process of price discovery will also reduce the uncertainty surrounding the financial institutions holding these securities, potentially enabling them to raise new private capital. The Legacy Securities Program consists of two related parts designed to draw private capital into these markets by providing debt financing from the Federal Reserve under the Term Asset-Backed Securities Loan Facility (TALF) and through matching private capital raised for dedicated funds targeting legacy securities. The lending program will address the broken markets for securities tied to residential and commercial real estate and consumer credit. The intention is to incorporate this program into the previously announced TALF.
Providing investors greater confidence to purchase legacy assets: as with securitizations backed by new originations of consumer and business credit already included in the TALF, Treasury expects that the provision of leverage through this program will give investors greater confidence to purchase these assets, thus increasing market liquidity.
Funding purchase of legacy securities: through this new program, non-recourse loans will be made available to investors to fund purchases of legacy securitization assets. Eligible assets are expected to include certain non-agency residential mortgage backed securities (RMBS) that were originally rated AAA and outstanding commercial mortgage-backed securities (CMBS) and asset-backed securities (ABS) that are rated AAA.
Working with market participants: borrowers will need to meet eligibility criteria. Haircuts will be determined at a later date and will reflect the riskiness of the assets provided as collateral. Lending rates, minimum loan sizes, and loan durations have not been determined, however, the Federal Reserve is working to ensure that the duration of these loans takes into account the duration of the underlying assets.

The Treasury Department will make co-investment/leverage available to partner with private capital providers to immediately support the market for legacy mortgage- and asset-backed securities originated prior to 2009 with a rating of AAA at origination. They will approve up to five asset managers with a demonstrated track record of purchasing legacy assets, however, they may consider adding more depending on the quality of applications received. Managers whose proposals have been approved will have a period of time to raise private capital to target the designated asset classes and will receive matching Treasury funds under the Public–Private Investment Program. Treasury funds will be invested one-for-one on a fully side-by-side basis with these investors.

Asset managers will have the ability, if their investment fund structures meet certain guidelines, to subscribe for senior debt for the Public–Private Investment Fund from the Treasury Department in the amount of 50% of total equity capital of the fund. The Treasury Department will consider requests for senior debt for the fund in the amount of 100% of its total equity capital subject to further restrictions.

Criticism
Economist and Nobel Prize winner Paul Krugman has been very critical of this program arguing the non-recourse loans lead to a hidden subsidy that will be split by asset managers, banks' shareholders and creditors. Mr. Krugman argues that this will lead to wild overbidding for assets. Yet, research into the structure of the program shows that the overbidding incentives in non-recourse loans are subtle.  If there are overbidding incentives, they depend on the amount of leverage, the interest rates and guarantee fees charged by the Federal Reserve or the FDIC, respectively, and the volatility of the toxic assets.  Banking analyst Meridith Whitney argues that banks will not sell bad assets at fair market values because they are reluctant to take asset write downs.  Removing toxic assets would also reduce the volatility of banks' stock prices.  Because stock is a call option on a firm's assets, this lost volatility will hurt the stock price of distressed banks.  Therefore, such banks will only sell toxic assets at above market prices. The program has been hampered by the announcement by Standard & Poor's that many eligible assets would be downgraded by the rating agency, making them ineligible for the program. Federal Reserve of New York president William Dudley stated on June 4, 2009 that "there's a huge administrative hurdle" to implementing the program.

References

External links
  (Listing of all economic recovery measures, including from the TARP program.)
 

Great Recession in the United States
Presidency of Barack Obama
Troubled Asset Relief Program